Charles William Henry Montagu-Scott, 4th Duke of Buccleuch and 6th Duke of Queensberry, KT (24 May 1772 – 20 April 1819), styled Earl of Dalkeith until 1812, was a British landowner, amateur cricketer and Tory politician.

Background and education
Styled Earl of Dalkeith from birth, he was born in London, England, the fourth child of seven, and the second son of Henry Scott, 3rd Duke of Buccleuch and Lady Elizabeth Montagu, daughter of George Montagu, 1st Duke of Montagu. His elder brother George had died when only two months old after receiving a smallpox inoculation. He was educated at Eton and Christ Church, Oxford.

Cricket career
Lord Dalkeith was an amateur cricketer who made four known appearances in first-class cricket matches in 1797. He was a member of Marylebone Cricket Club (MCC).

Public life
Dalkeith was returned to Parliament for Marlborough in 1793, a seat he held until 1796, and then represented Ludgershall until 1804, Mitchell between 1805 and 1806 and Marlborough again between 1806 and 1807. The latter year he was summoned to the House of Lords through a writ of acceleration in his father's junior title of Baron Scott of Tyndale. He was also Lord-Lieutenant of Selkirkshire between 1794 and 1797, of Dumfriesshire between 1797 and 1819 and of Midlothian between 1812 and 1819. He was appointed a deputy lieutenant of Northamptonshire on 9 May 1803. In 1812 he was made a Knight of the Thistle. He succeeded his father in the dukedom the same year and one of his first acts was to commission what is now the oldest iron bridge in Scotland. Also in 1813 his long-time friend Walter Scott was offered the position of Poet Laureate. Montagu counselled him to retain his literary independence, and the position went to Scott's friend, Robert Southey.

Family

A statue of Scott, by Joseph Durham, stands in the centre of Dunchurch, Warwickshire.

Buccleuch married the Honourable Harriet Katherine Townshend (29 November 1773 – 24 August 1814), daughter of Thomas Townshend, 1st Viscount Sydney, on 24 March 1795. They had nine children:

 Lady Anne Elizabeth Montagu Scott (17 August 1796 – 13 August 1844).
 George Henry Scott, Lord Scott of Whitchester (2 January 1798 – 1 March 1808).
 Lady Charlotte Albinia Montagu Scott (16 July 1799 – 29 February 1828), married James Stopford, 4th Earl of Courtown.
 Lady Isabella Mary Montagu Scott (24 October 1800 – 9 October 1829), married the Honourable Peregrine Francis Cust.
 Lady Katherine Frances Montagu Scott (4 December 1803 – 6 June 1814).
 Walter Francis Montagu Douglas Scott, 5th Duke of Buccleuch and 7th Duke of Queensberry (25 November 1806 – 16 April 1884).
 Lord John Douglas-Montagu-Scott (13 July 1809 – 3 January 1860), MP for Roxburghshire; married Alicia Ann Spottiswoode.
 Lady Margaret Harriet Montagu Scott (12 June 1811 – 5 June 1846), married Charles Marsham, 3rd Earl of Romney.
 Lady Harriet Janet Sarah Scott (13 August 1814 – 16 February 1870), who married the Reverend Edward Moore and was the mother of Admiral Sir Arthur Moore.

The Duchess of Buccleuch died at Dalkeith House in August 1814, aged 40, and was buried at Warkton, Northamptonshire. Buccleuch died on 20 April 1819, aged 46, at Lisbon, Portugal, from tuberculosis, and was buried at Warkton. Having survived the death of his first-born son in 1808, he was succeeded by his second-born son, the twelve-year-old Walter, Earl of Dalkeith.

Titles, honours and awards
24 May 1772: Earl of Dalkeith
11 January 1812: His Grace The Duke of Buccleuch and Queensbury
22 May 1812: His Grace The Duke of Buccleuch and Queensbury KT

Ancestry

References

External links
 CricketArchive record
 

|-

|-

1772 births
1819 deaths
People educated at Eton College
Alumni of Christ Church, Oxford
106
204
Knights of the Thistle
Lord-Lieutenants of Dumfries
Lord-Lieutenants of Midlothian
Lord-Lieutenants of Selkirkshire
Dalkeith, Charles Montagu-Scott, Earl of
British MPs 1790–1796
British MPs 1796–1800
Dalkeith, Charles Montagu-Scott, Earl of
Dalkeith, Charles Montagu-Scott, Earl of
Dalkeith, Charles Montagu-Scott, Earl of
Dalkeith, Charles Montagu-Scott, Earl of
Buccleuch, D4
Charles
English cricketers
English cricketers of 1787 to 1825
Colonel C. Lennox's XI cricketers
18th-century Scottish landowners
Deputy Lieutenants of Northamptonshire
19th-century Scottish landowners
19th-century deaths from tuberculosis
Tuberculosis deaths in Portugal